Searcher or Searchers may refer to:

 HMS Searcher, a list of ships
 HMS Searcher (D40), a British escort carrier
 HMC Searcher a customs cutter of the UK.
 USS Searcher (AGR-4), a United States radar picket ship
 IAI Searcher, a type of unmanned aerial vehicle
 Searchers (search engine), an internet search engine
 Searchers (film), 2016 Canadian film
 "The Searcher", a segment on the television show Danger Theatre
 Searcher of the dead, a person employed in late medieval London to investigate the cause of death
 Calosoma, a genus of beetles
 Bathymaster signatus, a fish
 A magazine published by Information Today, Inc. that merged with Online in 2013 to become Online Searcher
 Searchers, or Ichneutae, a satyr play by Sophocles
 Searchers, enemies from the video game Bendy and the Ink Machine. They are sentient blobs of ink.

See also
 The Searchers (disambiguation)
 Searchers 2.0
 A Searchers EP
 Search (disambiguation)